Dongbu District may refer to:
Dongbu District, Dongguan
Dongbu District, Zhongshan